The Bridge over Institute Street is a pedestrian bridge located at Independence Square in Kyiv that crosses over Institute Street. It is also known as the bridge of Heavenly Hundred.

Description
The bridge was built in 2002 and provides a pedestrian viaduct from the October Palace to the Hlobus shopping mall on "Maidan".

During Euromaidan, on 20 February 2014 the bridge caught fire and was damaged.

Photos

See also
 Bridges in Kyiv

References

External links
 Brief video story about the bridge
 Bridge restoration interview
 Institutska 1

Bridges in Kyiv
Bridges completed in 2002
Pedestrian bridges in Ukraine
Maidan Nezalezhnosti
2002 establishments in Ukraine